is a Japanese food company that specializes in snack food. They are known for their variety of the caramel corn snack, manufactured since 1971.

Company history
In March 2003, Tohato applied for court protection from creditors after the failed operation of a golf course started during the asset-inflated bubble period. Following that, Unison Capital and Bandai acquired Tohato's confectionary business and set up a new company under the name of Tohato to turn its operations around.

Advertisement campaign

Tohato launched two new snacks brands, "Tyrant Habanero Burning Hell Hot" and "Satan Jorquia Bazooka Deadly Hot" in 2007 in an engagement marketing campaign, by combining multiplayer online gaming with advertising on a mobile phone. Customers were encouraged to join nightly battles at 4AM in a virtual game, on behalf of either snack brand, to determine the winner of the "World's Worst War". The campaign was designed by Japanese ad agency Hakuhodo and won the Yellow Pencil award at the annual D&AD advertising awards ceremony where mobile ads were recognized for the first time in May 2008.

Products

All Raisin
Beano
Bōkun Habanero
Caramel corn
ふわ丸 (Fuwamaru) Ninja snack
Harvest
Poteco
Chokobi (チョコビ)

References

External links
  Tohato official site

Food and drink companies based in Tokyo
Companies established in 2003
Confectionery companies of Japan